Chuk Yuen is a village in the San Tin area of Yuen Long District, Hong Kong.

Administration
Sheung Chuk Yuen and Ha Chuk Yuen, part of Chuk Yuen, are recognized villages under the New Territories Small House Policy.

References

Further reading

External links

 Delineation of area of existing village Chuk Yuen (San Tin) for election of resident representative (2019 to 2022)
 Antiquities Advisory Board. Historic Building Appraisal. Kong Ha Tong, No. 34 Sheung Chuk Yuen, San Tin Pictures
 Antiquities Advisory Board. Historic Building Appraisal. Kong Ha Tong, No. 35 Sheung Chuk Yuen, San Tin Pictures

Villages in Yuen Long District, Hong Kong
San Tin